The 2007 Summer Universiade officially known as the XXIV Summer Universiade and commonly known as Bangkok Universiade, was an international multi-sport for university athletes that took place from 8 to 18 August 2007 in Bangkok, Thailand, with preliminary events in some sports beginning on 7 August.

Bidding process
In 2003, FISU officially confirmed five candidate cities:
 Bangkok, Thailand
 Kaohsiung, Chinese Taipei
 Monterrey, Mexico
 Poznań, Poland
 Saskatoon, Canada
Bangkok, Saskatoon, Poznań, Kaohsiung and Monterrey were the five candidate cities.  However, Saskatoon Bid was withdrawn.

Bangkok's bid

Identity

Mascot
The official mascot of the 2007 Summer Universiade is a rabbit named Mighty Mai-Tri.The name of this mascot not only suggests power and friendship but it also corresponds to the Year of the Rabbit, which is the lunar year of King Bhumibol's birth.
The rabbit is a symbol of agility, intelligence, gentleness, and welcomes athletes of all nations. With a smile and friendship His appearance, color, and mannerism express humility. Which is one of the uniqueness of Thai's very long established culture.

Slogan
The slogan for the 24th Summer Universiade is, "All Become One", suggesting the unity of people of all races and religions from 150 countries.

Logo
The logo itself consists of 5 line colors arranged in a U shape, which is derived from the word Universiade is comparable to the lines of experience transmission. The exchange of knowledge and culture between representatives and athletes from universities from 5 continents around the world all in one. Connected into a golden yellow bird patterned symbol. Which is the identity of the Thai nation Filled with joy and pride to be honored as the center of transmission and exchange of cultures.

Venues

Calendar

{| class="wikitable" style="margin:0.5em auto; font-size:90%"
|-
| bgcolor=#00cc33 | ● || Opening Ceremony || bgcolor=#3399ff | ● || Competitions || bgcolor=#ffcc00 | ● || Finals || bgcolor=#ee3333 | ● || Closing Ceremony
|-

Sports

 Aquatics
 
 
 
 
 
 
 
 
 
 
 Artistic gymnastics (14)
 Rhythmic gymnastics (8)

Medal table

References

External links
 Summer Universiade Bangkok 2007
 Official website of the German University Sports Federation
 Canadian medalists organized by sport

 
World University Games, Summer
World University Games, Summer
World University Games, Summer
Summer World University Games
World University Games, Summer